Copper(I) nitrate is a proposed inorganic compound with formula of CuNO3.  It has not been characterized by X-ray crystallography.  It is the focus of one publication, which describes unsuccessful efforts to isolate the compound. Another nonexistent simple copper(I) compound derived from an oxyanion is cuprous perchlorate. On the other hand, cuprous sulfate is known.

Derivatives
The nitrate salt of the acetonitrile complex, i.e., [Cu(MeCN)4]NO3, is generated by the reaction of silver nitrate with a suspension of copper metal in acetonitrile.
Cu  +  AgNO3  +  4 CH3CN  →  [Cu(CH3CN)4]NO3  +  Ag

Tertiary phosphine complexes of the type [Cu(P(C6H5)3)3]NO3 are prepared by the reduction of copper(II) nitrate by the phosphine.

References

Copper(I) compounds